Arne Patrik Klüft (born Arne Patrik Kristiansson on 3 June 1977 in Gothenburg) is a Swedish pole vault athlete.

He made his breakthrough in 1998 when he set a new Swedish record with 5.77 metres. In 2001 he jumped 5.83 and the following year 5.85. One of his greatest success came at the 2003 World Championships in Paris where he equalled his personal best and won the bronze medal.

Other achievements include silver at the 2002 European Indoor Championships in Vienna, silver at the 1996 World Junior Championships in Sydney, three Swedish records, fourth place at the 2002 European Championships in Munich as well as 4 national championships (1998, 2001, 2002, 2003).

He is married to Carolina Klüft and the couple lives in Karlskrona.

Personal bests 
Pole vault – 5.85 metres (23 August 2002, Finnkampen 2002, Helsinki)

References

External links 

Swedish male pole vaulters
1977 births
Living people
Athletes (track and field) at the 2000 Summer Olympics
Athletes (track and field) at the 2004 Summer Olympics
Olympic athletes of Sweden
World Athletics Championships medalists
Örgryte IS Friidrott athletes
Athletes from Gothenburg